List of AM Expanded Band station assignments issued by the Federal Communications Commission on March 17, 1997 is a review of the initial eighty-eight assignments, made by the Federal Communications Commission (FCC), for populating in the United States the "Expanded Band" frequencies of 1610 to 1700 kHz, which had been recently added to the AM broadcasting band.

Background

On June 8, 1988, an International Telecommunication Union-sponsored conference held at Rio de Janeiro, Brazil adopted provisions, effective July 1, 1990, to extend the upper end of the Region 2 AM broadcast band, by adding ten frequencies which spanned from 1610 kHz to 1700 kHz. The agreement provided for a standard transmitter power of 1 kilowatt, which could be increased to 10 kilowatts in cases where it did not result in undue interference.

In the United States, the normal Federal Communications Commission (FCC) practice for station applications on the standard AM band frequencies had been to individually process requests. For the expanded band, the Commission decided to allocate the entire band at once on a nationwide basis, after evaluating all of the stations which notified the FCC that they were interested in moving to the new band. In the fall of 1994, the FCC announced that, out of 688 applicants, a specially designed computer program (which took two weeks to run) had chosen 79 stations to make the transfer to the expanded band. However, a year later the Commission rescinded these assignments, after it was determined that there had been major flaws in the data used to evaluate the applications. On March 22, 1996, the FCC announced a revised allocation table, consisting of 87 stations, but this too was eventually withdrawn due to errors.

The FCC's third, and final, allocation was announced on March 17, 1997, and provided for 88 assignments. In most cases the expanded band operations, despite being modifications to existing stations, were licensed as new stations, separately from the original standard band station. With only one exception, only stations included in the March 17, 1997 list have been permitted to operate on an expanded band frequency. The sole exception occurred in 2006, when the FCC granted a waiver giving permission for WRCR in Ramapo, New York to move from 1300 to 1700 kHz.

The FCC originally assumed that the expanded band stations would simulcast the programming of the original standard band stations, and be licensed to the same community. However, in most cases the expanded band stations have run separate programming, and a few have moved to other communities as much as 450 kilometers (280 miles) away. One policy the FCC has generally enforced is that paired original and expanded band stations must remain under common ownership. However, a waiver was granted for 1320/1650 in Fort Smith, Arkansas, where the Commission approved separately owned stations.

In order to allow for an orderly transition period, the FCC initially provided that both the original station and its expanded band counterpart could optionally operate simultaneously for up to five years, after which owners would have to turn in one of the two licenses, depending on whether they preferred the new assignment or elected to remain on the original frequency. However, the FCC has repeatedly extended this deadline, and reported that as of October 2015 there were 25 cases where co-owned standard band and expanded band stations were still active, some of which were approaching 20 years of operation. This report also noted that "A total of 88 Expanded Band channels were originally allotted. There were 67 applications filed for Expanded Band allotments, of which 66 construction permits were granted, with one application still pending. Licenses were granted to 54 stations that migrated from the standard AM band to the Expanded Band. Of those, 22 unconditionally surrendered their standard band licenses and remained in the Expanded Band; three conditionally surrendered their standard band licenses, and four standard band licenses were canceled by the Commission. The Commission also received one unconditional surrender of an Expanded Band authorization and one conditional surrender, and it canceled one Expanded Band license."

In one case a multi-year deleted expanded band station, WJCC in Miami Springs, Florida, was relicensed. WJCC was deleted on February 23, 2006, however, because numerous other joint standard/expanded band station pairs had been permitted to operate beyond the initial five-year deadline, a petition to resume operations was granted, with WJCC's license restored on October 4, 2012.

Table of March 17, 1997 assignments

Review of the 88 Expanded Band authorizations made by the Federal Communications Commission on March 17, 1997. In the table below:

 For the "Original Standard Band Assignment" entries, the FCC's March 17, 1997 notification listed station's call signs and frequencies as of June 30, 1993, dating to when the stations initially notified the commission that they were interested in participating.
 "FCC Appl. BP#" refers to the identifier assigned by the FCC to the 67 applications that were filed for authorizations to construct the Expanded Band station. These identifiers were assigned on the day the application was received, and were given a prefix of "BP-". An "n/a" entry indicates the 21 cases where, despite being authorized, no application was ever filed to construct the Expanded Band station.
 "CP" refers to an FCC Construction Permit issued where an application to build the Expanded Band station was approved.
 Cells for stations that are still licensed are highlighted with a beige background.

References

External links
 Mesa Mike's List of Deleted AM Radio Station Facilities (mesamike.org)
 "FCC Public Notice: Mass Media Bureau Announces Revised AM Expanded Band Allotment Plan and Filing Window for Eligible Stations" (FCC DA 97-537), March 17, 1997. (The call signs and station frequencies listed in this notice are those that the station had as of June 30, 1993)

AM Expanded Band station assignments 1997